New Turkey Party may refer to:

 New Turkey Party (1961), a defunct party founded in 1961
 New Turkey Party (2002), a defunct party founded in 2002

See also
 New Party (Turkey)